Rafael Pineda (born January 12, 1966 in Barranquilla, Colombia) is a former Colombian boxer at welterweight.

Professional career 
Known as "Derby", Pineda turned pro in 1986 and in 1989 took on former Olympian Mark Breland for the WBA welterweight title, but was TKO'd in the fifth round. In 1991 he won the vacant IBF Light Welterweight title by beating Roger Mayweather with a ninth-round knockout. He successfully defended the title once before losing it by decision to welterweight legend Pernell Whitaker in 1992. Pineda retired after the loss, but came back in 1996.

Comeback 
Pineda launched a comeback in 1996 and fought for a few years in his native Colombia before taking on Cory Spinks in 2002, losing a technical decision. In 2004 he lost a close split decision to phenom Zab Judah. He has not fought since the loss.

Personal 
Pineda is the brother of fellow boxer Hugo Pineda.

References

External links 
 

1966 births
International Boxing Federation champions
Living people
Colombian male boxers
Sportspeople from Barranquilla
Welterweight boxers
20th-century Colombian people